Wilmar may refer to:

Wilmar, Arkansas
Wilmar, California
Wilmar International, a Singaporean food processing and investment holding company
Wilmar Valdez (born 1965), Uruguayan football executive

See also
 Willmar, Minnesota
 Willmar (disambiguation)

nl:Wilmar